Alexander L. Wolf (born 12 September 1956) is a Computer Scientist known for his research in software engineering, distributed systems,
and computer networking. He is credited, along with his many collaborators, with introducing the modern study of software architecture,
content-based publish/subscribe messaging,
content-based networking, automated process discovery,
and the software deployment lifecycle. Wolf's 1985 Ph.D. dissertation
developed language features for expressing a module's import/export specifications and the notion of multiple interfaces for a type, both of which are now
common in modern computer programming languages.

Wolf is Past President of the Association for Computing Machinery (ACM).
Previously, he served as ACM's Vice President, Secretary-Treasurer, Chair of the Special Interest Group (SIG) Governing Board, and Chair of SIGSOFT, the
special interest group in software engineering. He has been an associate editor of the ACM Transactions on Software Engineering and Methodology and
IEEE Transactions on Software Engineering.

For his research and service, Wolf has been awarded numerous honors, including elevation to ACM Fellow, IEEE Fellow, and
BCS Chartered Fellow.

Life and career

Wolf was born in New York City to Viennese Austrian immigrant parents. He attended Stuyvesant High School, a public high school specializing in
mathematics and science, graduating in 1974. Wolf majored in both Geology and Computer Science at Queens College, City University of New York,
where he received his BA degree in 1979.

From 1979 to 1985 he studied Computer Science at the University of Massachusetts Amherst, receiving his MS degree in 1982 and Ph.D. degree in 1985. He remained at the University of Massachusetts Amherst for two more years as a Visiting Assistant Professor and Research Scientist working on the Arcadia Project, which was laying the technical and theoretical foundations for tool-rich, geographically
distributed software development environments.

In 1987 Wolf joined AT&T Bell Laboratories in Murray Hill, New Jersey as a Member of the Technical Staff, where he conducted seminal research in the areas
of Object Databases, Software Process, and Software Architecture.

Wolf began his academic career when he moved to the University of Colorado Boulder Department of Computer Science as an assistant professor in 1992. After
promotion to associate and then full professor, he was named to the Charles V. Schelke Endowed Chair in the College of Engineering in
2005. He took a two-year leave of absence to help found the Faculty of Informatics at the University of Lugano, the first such faculty in the Italian-speaking
region of Switzerland. In 2006, Wolf became a professor in the Department of Computing at Imperial College London. In July 2016, he became the sixth dean of the Jack Baskin School of Engineering at the University of California, Santa Cruz.

Honors and awards

 ACM Fellow (2006)
 Royal Society Wolfson Research Merit Award (2007)
 BCS Chartered Fellow (2008)
 ACM SIGSOFT Research Impact Award (2008)
 University of Massachusetts Amherst Department of Computer Science Outstanding Research Alumni Award (2010)
 IEEE Fellow (2011)
 ACM SIGSOFT Research Impact Award (2011)
 ACM SIGSOFT Distinguished Service Award (2012)
 ACM SIGSOFT Outstanding Research Award (2014)

References

External links
 Imperial College London: Alexander L. Wolf, Department of Computing
 Association for Computing Machinery: ACM
 Association for Computing Machinery: ACM author page

1956 births
Fellows of the Association for Computing Machinery
Fellow Members of the IEEE
Fellows of the British Computer Society
Presidents of the Association for Computing Machinery
Computer scientists
Software engineering researchers
Researchers in distributed computing
Computer systems researchers
Stuyvesant High School alumni
Queens College, City University of New York alumni
University of Massachusetts Amherst alumni
Living people